The Greyhound Trainer of the Year or Champion Trainer is an award for the leading greyhound trainer in the United Kingdom.

It was inaugurated in 1961 and was originally elected by a press panel  but is now awarded to the trainer who achieves the most points for winning open races on the Greyhound Board of Great Britain annual racing calendar.

Mark Wallis has won the most titles with 13, he set a new record at the end of 2016, passing the previous record of seven set by John 'Ginger' McGee Sr. and has extended the record to 13 with further wins in 2017, 2018, 2019, 2021 and 2022.

The award should not be confused with the Trainers Championship which is an annual event held between the leading six trainers.

Past winners

References

Greyhound racing competitions in the United Kingdom
Recurring sporting events established in 1961